This is a list of public holidays in Saba.

References

Saba
Public holidays in the Netherlands
Public holidays in the Caribbean